Fritz Ihlau (28 August 1909 – 1995) was a German composer. He also composed under the pseudonym Fred Langen, especially rhythmically more modern works.

Life 
Born in Hanover, Ilhau studied music, literature and theatre studies from 1930 to 1935 at the University of Marburg and the  University of Munich, where he received a doctorate (PhD). He joined the Christian student fraternity  In the field of music, he studied counterpoint and composition with Hans Stieber. As a student, he gave concerts under the direction of Otto Ebel von Sosen and made radio recordings under the direction of Karl List.

Afterwards, he graduated from the Tonmeisterschule in Frankfurt. After the Second World War, he worked as a freelance journalist in Traunstein / Upper Bavaria. In 1950, he moved to WDR in Cologne as Tonmeister and was additionally appointed as the main program designer in 1961.

Ilhau retired in 1975 but remained in the music world through his compositions. Ihlau's oeuvre includes an operetta, a ballet, church music, songs, choral works and orchestral pieces.

Work

Works for orchestra 
 Auf der Alm – Kurpark-Bummel Intermezzo
 Zigeuner Rhapsodie (Gipsy-Rhapsody)
 Kleine Episode for salon orchestra
 Romantische Ouvertüre for large orchestra (1933)
 Serenade for flute, oboe and string orchestra (1942)

Works for wind orchestra 
 1965 Festlicher Aufklang
 1983 Bergische Ouvertüre
 1983 Romantisches Zwischenspiel
 1984 Festliche Trompeten Intrada
 Bergischer Marsch
 Gut Gelaunt
 Sentimental Dreams
 Vier ernste Weisen

Mass and sacred music 
 St. George's Mass in E minor (Wißkirchen) for mixed choir, soprano solo and organ
 Christmas Carol Suite for soloists (STB), Choir 1 (SSA), Choir 2 (TTBB) and Orchestra ad libitum or piano

Stage works 
 1942 Das Zauberschloss Operetta

Choral work 
 Frühlingsspaziergang
 Herr Wirt habt ihr noch kühlen Wein

References

External links 
 
 

German composers
20th-century classical composers
German music journalists
1909 births
1995 deaths
People from Hanover